Burton Pidsea is a village and civil parish in the Holderness area of the East Riding of Yorkshire, England.

According to the 2011 UK census, Burton Pidsea parish had a population of 944, an increase on the 2001 UK census figure of 888.

There is a church, village hall, a Costcutter minimarket which incorporates both a post office and a petrol station, two public houses, a primary school and a playing field.

Other local amenities include a bowls club.

The church dedicated to Saint Peter and Saint Paul was designated a Grade I listed building in 1966 and is now recorded in the National Heritage List for England, maintained by Historic England.

References

External links

Burton Pidsea Memorial Hall
Burton Pidsea images @ Google.co.uk
British History Online
Domesday Reloaded 
Burton Pidsea Primary School

Villages in the East Riding of Yorkshire
Holderness
Civil parishes in the East Riding of Yorkshire